Jaap Robben (born 1984) is a Dutch writer. An acclaimed author of children's books, he published his debut novel for adults Birk in 2014. The book was a bestseller in the Netherlands where it won several awards. The book has been translated into English by David Doherty.

Selected works
 Twee vliegen (Two Flies, 2004)
 De nacht krekelt (The Night is Full of Crickets, 2007)
 Zullen we een bos beginnen? (Shall We Start a Wood?, 2008, shortlisted for the Gouden Uil for Children’s Literature)
 De Zuurtjes (The Sourballs, 2010) 
 Als iemand ooit mijn botjes vindt (If Anyone Finds My Bones, 2012). 
 Birk (2014, translated as You Have Me to Love. Winner of the Dioraphte Prize, the ANV Debut Prize, etc.)

References

21st-century Dutch writers
Living people
1984 births